The Chicago District Golf Association (CDGA) is a non-profit association of member clubs and individual golfers in Illinois and parts of Indiana, Wisconsin and Michigan. With more than 80,000 member golfers at 400 member clubs, the CDGA is one of the largest and oldest golf associations in the United States. Founded on March 18, 1914 under the direction of Francis S. Peabody, the CDGA was established for the benefit of caddy welfare and to manage amateur golf tournaments in the Midwest. The CDGA is responsible for the administration of more than 50 tournaments each summer, including the Illinois State Amateur Championship and the CDGA Amateur Championship.  The Illinois State Amateur is the state's premier amateur event, while the CDGA Amateur is the oldest championship in the Midwest.

The Sunshine Through Golf Foundation is the charitable arm of the CDGA, conducting therapeutic golf programs for people with special needs and disabled military veterans.

References

External links
 Chicago District Golf Association
 Sunshine Through Golf Foundation

Golf in Chicago
Golf associations